The Globis Cup is an international Go competition for players under the age of 20. The tournament was created in 2014 and is held annually. It is organized by the Nihon Ki-in and sponsored by Globis, a Japanese company.

Rules

The Globis Cup is an under-20 Go competition, with 16 players in total from China, Japan, South Korea, Chinese Taipei, Europe, North America, and other Asian countries or Oceania. Players must be under 20 years old on January 1 of the year of the tournament (and may turn 20 by the time the event is actually held). Each player has 30 seconds per move, along with 10 one-minute periods of extra thinking time, which is like the NHK Cup.

The winner receives 1,500,000 yen in prize money, the runner-up receives 250,000 yen, and third place receives 100,000 yen (as of the 9th cup). Formerly, from the 1st to the 6th cup, these prizes were 3,000,000 yen, 500,000 yen, and 200,000 yen, respectively.

Winners and runners-up

References

External links
Official website
Nihon Ki-in archive (in Japanese)
https://gotoeveryone.k2ss.info/news/wr/gc/ – game records

International Go competitions